This is a complete list of FIS Alpine Ski World Cup winners of men's discipline titles, the list is completed by the second and third classified.

Podiums standings

Season-end podiums

Slalom
In the following table men's slalom World Cup season-end podiums since first season in 1967.

Downhill

In the following table men's downhill World Cup season-end podiums since first edition in 1967.

Giant slalom
In the following table men's giant slalom World Cup season-end podiums since first edition in 1967.

Super-G
In the following table men's Super-G World Cup season-end podiums since first edition in 1986.

Combined
In the following table men's combined World Cup season-end podiums since first edition in 1975.

Parallel
In the following table men's Parallel World Cup season-end podiums since first season in 2020.

See also
List of FIS Alpine Ski World Cup winners of women's discipline titles
List of FIS Alpine Ski World Cup men's champions
List of FIS Alpine Ski World Cup women's champions

References

External links

Ski-db.com - World Cup results database

Men's discipline
World Cup, Men
Lists of sportsmen
Lists of skiers
Lists of male skiers
FIS